Lactarius acicularis is a member of the large milk-cap genus Lactarius in the order Russulales. Described as new to science in 2010, the species is found in Chiang Mai Province of northern Thailand, where it grows in rainforests that are dominated by  Castanopsis armata, Dipterocarpus sp. and Lithocarpus. The specific epithet, is derived from Latin and means "needle-shaped".

See also 
 List of Lactarius species

References

External links 
 

acicularis
Fungi described in 2010
Fungi of Asia